

Indigenous maps
Whereas most known early maps of Africa were prepared in the framework of the colonial enterprise, some indigenous maps have been recently uncovered, particularly in West Africa and Ethiopia.

Earliest European maps
The earliest cartographic depictions of Africa are found in early world maps.
In classical antiquity, Africa (also Libya) was assumed to cover the quarter of the globe south of the Mediterranean, an arrangement that was adhered to in medieval T and O maps.

The only part of Africa well known in antiquity was  the  coast of North Africa, described in Greek periplus from the 6th century BC.
Hellenistic era geographers defined Ancient Egypt as part of Asia, taking the boundary of Asia and Egypt to lie at the Catabathmus Magnus (the escarpment of Akabah el-Kebir in western Egypt).  Ptolemy's world map (2nd century) shows a reasonable awareness of the general topography of North Africa, but is unaware of anything south of the equator. The limit of Ptolemy's knowledge in the west is Cape Spartel (35° 48′ N); while he does assume that the coast eventually retreats in a "Great Gulf of the Western Ocean", this is not likely based on any knowledge of the Gulf of Guinea. In the east, Ptolemy is aware of the Red Sea (Sinus Arabicus) and the protrusion of the Horn of Africa, describing the gulf south of the Horn of Africa as Sinus Barbaricus.

Modern maps
With the European exploration of Africa from the 15th century, maps of Africa became more precise.
The Fra Mauro map of 1459 shows a more detailed picture of Africa as a continent, including the Cape of Diab at its southernmost point, reflecting an expedition of 1420. Sebastian Münster's Cosmographia (1545) labels the Cape of Good Hope, reached by Bartolomeu Dias in 1488,  as caput bonae spei. The interior of Africa was not mapped in any detail before the second half of the 19th century.

References

Sources

Further reading

See also

History of Cartography
Old World

Geography of Africa
Cartography by continent